Judolia scapularis is a species of beetle in the family Cerambycidae. It was described by Van Dyke in 1920.

References

S
Beetles described in 1920